The São Paulo Street Circuit is a street circuit in São Paulo, Brazil which hosted the São Paulo Indy 300 between 2010–2013, and will host São Paulo ePrix from March 2023.

IndyCar 

The street circuit race track was laid out in the Santana district. The circuit was along the Sambadrome of Anhembi and utilized portions of the Marginal Tietê service drive. The circuit hosted the São Paulo Indy 300 for four years (2010–2013).

Even though it was a temporary circuit, it still had a permanent seating capacity of 30,000 people as it passes through the Anhembi Sambadrome.

Formula E 
A Formula E race was planned in 2018. However in November 2017, it was announced that the São Paulo ePrix would be postponed to the 2018–2019 Formula E season. After several postponements, the contract was finally signed on 30 April 2022 for 5 years.  

The site is set to host the inaugural São Paulo ePrix in 25 March 2023 as part of the 2022–23 Formula E season. The track will have  length and will use a good part of the original IndyCar circuit. The green flag will be inside the Anhembi Sambadrome.

Winners

IndyCar Series

South American GT Championship

Lap records

The official fastest lap records at the São Paulo Street Circuit are listed as:

References 

São Paulo Street Circuit
Sports venues in São Paulo
IndyCar Series tracks
Formula E circuits